Tepa may refer to:

 Stinkheads, fermented whitefish heads, a traditional food of the Yup'ik peoples in southwest Alaska
 Tepa, Ghana, a town in Ghana
 Tepa-ye Olya, a village in Iran
 Tepa-ye Sofla, a village in Iran
 Tepa, the administrative centre of Babar Islands, Maluku Province, Indonesia
 Ţepa, a village in Paltin Commune, Vrancea County, Romania
 A tree, Laureliopsis philippiana, native to Chile and Argentina
 Uch Tepa, a city district of Tashkent, Uzbekistan
 Tepa (bug), a shield bug genus in the tribe Pentatomini
 Tetraethylenepentamine, a chemical compound